In modal logic, standard translation is a way of transforming formulas of modal logic into formulas of first-order logic which capture the meaning of the modal formulas. Standard translation is defined inductively on the structure of the formula. In short, atomic formulas are mapped onto unary predicates and the objects in the first-order language are the accessible worlds. The logical connectives from propositional logic remain untouched and the modal operators are transformed into first-order formulas according to their semantics.

Definition 

Standard translation is defined as follows:

, where  is an atomic formula; P(x) is true when  holds in world .

In the above,  is the world from which the formula is evaluated. Initially, a free variable  is used and whenever a modal operator needs to be translated, a fresh variable is introduced to indicate that the remainder of the formula needs to be evaluated from that world. Here, the subscript  refers to the accessibility relation that should be used: normally,  and  refer to a relation  of the Kripke model but more than one accessibility relation can exist (a multimodal logic) in which case subscripts are used. Alternatively, it can also be placed inside the modal symbol.

Example 

 

The whole standard translation of this example becomes

 

which precisely captures the semantics of two boxes in modal logic. Note that the formula is also true when no such accessible worlds exist. In case  has no accessible worlds then  is false but the whole formula is vacuously true: an implication is also true when the antecedent is false.

Standard translation and modal depth 

The modal depth of a formula also becomes apparent in the translation to first-order logic. When the modal depth of a formula is k, then the first-order logic formula contains a 'chain' of k transitions from the starting world . The worlds are 'chained' in the sense that these worlds are visited by going from accessible to accessible world. Informally, the number of transitions in the 'longest chain' of transitions in the first-order formula is the modal depth of the formula.

The modal depth of the formula used in the example above is two. This is also the modal depth of the formula as each modal operator increases the modal depth by one.

References 
 Patrick Blackburn and Johan van Benthem (1988), Modal Logic: A Semantic Perspective.

Modal logic
Predicate logic